Heather McGowan is an American writer. She is the author of the novels Schooling and Duchess of Nothing Schooling was named a Best Book of the Year by Newsweek, The Detroit Free Press and The Hartford Courant.

Education 
McGowan has a master in fine arts from Brown University.

Career 
Heather McGowan’s original screenplay Tadpole was turned into a film directed by Gary Winick and starring Sigourney Weaver. The film won Best Director at Sundance Film Festival in 2002 and was subsequently released by Miramax.

In 2006, McGowan and British visual artist Liam Gillick collaborated to produce the limited edition book, Le Montrachet, published by Rocky Point Press in 2006.

McGowan won the Rome Prize in Literature in 2011. She was awarded the 2012 Mary Ellen von der Heyden Berlin Prize Fellowship for Fiction at the American Academy in Berlin.

Selected publications 

 Schooling, Doubleday/Faber UK, ISBN 978-0-385-50138-5
 Duchess of Nothing, Bloomsbury/Faber UK, ISBN 9781596910669

Personal life 
She lives in Provincetown, Massachusetts.

References 

Living people
Year of birth missing (living people)
21st-century American women writers
American women screenwriters
Brown University alumni